Mamurius mopsus is a species of leaf-footed bug in the family Coreidae. It is found in the Caribbean Sea, Central America, and North America.

References

Coreinae
Articles created by Qbugbot
Insects described in 1862